The O'Brien Press is an Irish publisher of mainly children's fiction and adult non-fiction.

History
The O'Brien Press was founded in 1973, evolving out of a family-run printing and type-house. Its first publication came in November 1974 and numerous other titles soon followed. O'Brien published books are regularly shortlisted for the Bisto Book of the Year Awards. As of 2007, no less than 24 books published by the O'Brien Press have won a Bisto Book of the Year Awards.

Successes
The O'Brien Press is notable for launching the career of international, bestselling author, Eoin Colfer, publishing the "Benny Books" and The Wish List, and have also published The General by Paul Williams, which was made into a major film by John Boorman in 1998.

It is the only Irish publishing house to have received the prestigious International Reading Association Award.

Authors published by O'Brien Press
Marita Conlon-McKenna (born 1956) – a children's novels author, including Children of the Famine trilogy
Judi Curtin – author of Alice and Megan series, including Alice Next Door 
Paul Howard (born 1971) –  journalist and author of the Ross O'Carroll-Kelly series
Gerry Hunt (born 1936) – an Irish comics writer and artist
Conor Kostick – an historian and writer, including the Avatar Chronicles
Oisín McGann (born 1973) – a children and young adult author and illustrator
Shay Healy (1943–2021) – a songwriter, broadcaster and journalist
Elizabeth Shaw (artist) (1920–1992) – an Irish artist, illustrator and children's book author
Gerard Whelan (born 1957) – a children's author

Brandon
Brandon is an imprint of O'Brien Press.  Brandon Books was independently established in Dingle, County Kerry by Steve McDonogh but subsequently folded when he died.  Authors published by Brandon include Gerry Adams, Alice Taylor, Mary Morrissy and Frank McGuinness.

See also

References

External links
 

Book publishing companies of Ireland